Henry Haley Schriver (October 13, 1914 – March 27, 2011) was a former member of the Ohio House of Representatives.

References

External links

Members of the Ohio House of Representatives
2011 deaths
1914 births
People from Lorain County, Ohio